Renan Larue is a French writer, literary scholar and historian of vegetarianism. He is the author of several books on vegetarianism or veganism, including Le végétarisme et ses ennemis (2015), a history of vegetarianism from Pythagoras until the modern day, and La pensée végane: 50 regards sur la condition animale (2020). In 2016 he offered the first course in vegan studies in the United States at the University of California, Santa Barbara.

Early life and education
Born in the Côtes-d'Armor, Larue studied French literature at the Paris-Sorbonne University, graduating in 2000 with a BA. He went on to obtain three master's degrees: in history from the School for Advanced Studies in the Social Sciences in Paris in 2002, in philosophy from the University of Paris I in 2003, and in classical literature from the University of Strasbourg in 2006. In 2007, he received an Agrégation de lettres modernes.

Larue was awarded a PhD in French literature in 2011 by the University of Picardy Jules Verne. His PhD dissertation focused on the history of vegetarianism in the West and formed the basis of his first book, Le végétarisme et ses ennemis.

Career
Larue is an assistant professor of French literature at the University of California, Santa Barbara. In 2016 he offered a course in vegan studies, the first course of its kind in the United States. He currently runs the Vegan Studies program at the University of California, Santa Barbara.

Writing 
In Le végétarisme et ses ennemis (2015), Larue reviews the history of vegetarianism in the West, focusing on the historical figures who defended it, including Pythagoras, Porphyry and Plutarch. He describes the attitudes of the major monotheistic religions towards the ideas conveyed by vegetarians, with particular emphasis on the hostility of the Catholic Church. He then turns to the Age of Enlightenment, where Voltaire played a leading role in the defense of vegetarianism, alongside Jean-Jacques Rousseau, Nicolas de Condorcet, Maupertuis, Bernardin de Saint-Pierre and Morelly. The book ends in the 20th century, with the story of the birth of veganism through the Vegan Society co-founded by Donald Watson, Elsie Shrigley and others.

In Le véganisme (2017), co-authored with Valéry Giroux, Larue, himself vegan, defends veganism as a philosophy and way of life, understood as a social and political movement based on a commitment to, as far as practically possible, avoid the subjugation, mistreatment and killing of sentient beings. In Le Végétarisme des Lumières (2019), he examines the medical and philosophical debates around vegetarianism that took place in 18th-century France. He also authored the preface to La révolution antispéciste ("The antispeciesist revolution"), a selection of twelve texts from the journal Cahiers antispécistes ("Antispeciesist notebooks").

Awards 
Larue received the Best PhD Dissertation Award from the University of Picardy Jules Verne in 2011. In 2016, the Académie Française awarded him the Prix La Bruyère silver medal for his book Le végétarisme et ses ennemis.

Selected works 
 (2014). 
 (2015). 
 (2017). 
 (2019). 
 (2020). Larue, Renan. La pensée végane: 50 regards sur la condition animale [Vegan thoughts: 50 perspectives on the condition of animals]. Paris: Presses Universitaires de France.

References 

Date of birth missing (living people)
Living people
21st-century French historians
21st-century French male writers
French academics
French animal rights activists
French animal rights scholars
French veganism activists
Historians of vegetarianism
People from Côtes-d'Armor
School for Advanced Studies in the Social Sciences alumni
University of California, Santa Barbara faculty
University of Paris alumni
University of Strasbourg alumni
Year of birth missing (living people)
University of Picardy Jules Verne alumni